Grigorii Klimentev (Russian: Григорий Григорьевич Климентьев; born 13 December  2000) is a Russian artistic gymnast. At the 2021 World Championships he won the bronze medal in still rings, sharing it in a tie with Salvatore Maresca. He also had won a gold medal on still rings in the Mersin leg of the 2021 FIG Artistic Gymnastics World Cup series.

Career
Klimentev began gymnastics at age five in  Petrozavodsk, Russia.

In 2018 he became the  European Junior Champion on still rings and won the Team title along with team mates Yuri Busse, Viktor Kalyuzhin, Mikhail Khudchenko and Sergei Naidin.

In 2021 Klimentev became the Russian Champion on still rings, beating veteran Denis Ablyazin. He made his senior international debut at the   Mersin World Cup were he won gold on still rings. He was one of the athletes representing RGF at the 2021 World Championships were he won the bronze medal on still rings.

Competitive history

References

External links 
 

2000 births
Living people
Russian male artistic gymnasts
Sportspeople from the Republic of Karelia
Medalists at the World Artistic Gymnastics Championships
21st-century Russian people